RailRadar GPS (by RailYatri) is a live tracker allowing users to watch the movements of passenger trains running in India on an interactive map. All passenger trains in India are operated by state-owned Indian Railways.  In the first release the location and status of trains shown on the map was typically 15 to 30 minutes delayed from real-time. RailRadar was created when Indian Railways Center for Railway Information System (CRIS) and RailYatri joined hands, and the service was launched on 10 October 2012. RailRadar uses Google Maps as its web mapping software, and is accessible in the form of a website and a mobile app. RailRadar was discontinued by Indian Railways on 6 September 2013, before RailYatri relaunched it in November 2013. However the RailRadar service did not provide the actual running status or the actual location of the train, rather these locations were plotted based on the regular scheduled timetable.

RailYatri relaunched the site with RailRadar GPS in November 2015. RailRadar GPS determines train locations by analyzing the pattern of locations transmitted by the smartphone travelers sitting on the train, similar to how Google Maps determines traffic density on the road. RailRadar GPS shows train tracking data displayed on a Google Map, which also indicates the delay status of trains - trains running on time have green indicators, while those running late are marked red.

See also
Indian Railways
Centre for Railway Information Systems (CRIS)
Google Maps

References

External links
Official website

Indian Railways
Rail transport operations
Tracking